William Henry McDougall (born August 10, 1966) is a Canadian former professional ice hockey player. He is best known for his record-setting scoring performance during the 1992–1993 AHL playoffs, in which he set the AHL records for goals, assists, and points in a single playoff season.

Career

Amateur
As a youth, McDougall played in the 1979 Quebec International Pee-Wee Hockey Tournament with a minor ice hockey team from Toronto.

McDougall signed with the Erie Panthers following a successful season of senior hockey with the senior Port-aux-Basque Mariners. After scoring 80 goals and 148 points in just 57 games, he was signed by the NHL's Detroit Red Wings and finished the end of the 1989–90 season with their farm club, the  Adirondack Red Wings. McDougall was named to the ECHL All-Star First Team in 1990. He appeared in 2 games for the parent club the following season after posting a 99-point season with the Adirondack Red Wings.

Prior to his season of senior hockey, McDougall spent one season in the Saskatchewan Junior Hockey League. McDougall had one of the best seasons ever in the 1986-87 season with the Humboldt Broncos, leading the league with 83 goals, 104 assists, and 187 points in only 61 games. He also led the league with 27 power play goals and 9 short handed goals. After a season of Junior "B" hockey in which he scored 45 goals and 132 points in 42 games for the Streetsville Derbys, the 20-year-old decided to continue his hockey career out west with the Broncos.

The Broncos hosted the Centennial Cup that year and thanks to McDougall they got to the finals before being beaten by the Richmond Sockeyes of the BCJHL. He showed everyone at that tournament though that his regular season performance was no fluke as he had 11 points in four games and was named the tournament's all-star center.

Professional
Undrafted, MacDougall signed his first professional contract as a free agent with the Detroit Red Wings organization in 1989. While playing for the Adirondack Red Wings early in the 1991-92 season, MacDougall was attacked in the dressing room by head coach Barry Melrose after the coach became incensed over the player's refusal to listen to him. Melrose had to be pulled off MacDougall by several other players, and MacDougall's days in the Red Wings organization soon came to an end. The following season, Melrose would coach Wayne Gretzky and the Los Angeles Kings to the Stanley Cup Finals. 

McDougall was traded from Detroit to the Edmonton Oilers for Max Middendorf in February 1992, and ultimately made his mark on the hockey world with their AHL farm team, his hometown Cape Breton Oilers. The Cape Breton Oilers' 1992–1993 playoff run was one of the most dominant in AHL history, with McDougall emerging as the team's offensive star, scoring 52 points (26 goals and 26 assists) in 16 games en route to the Calder Cup championship. McDougall was awarded the Jack A. Butterfield Trophy as playoff MVP. To this day, his AHL records for goals, assists, and points in a single playoff season still stand.

Hoping to recreate his AHL success in the NHL, McDougall signed with the Tampa Bay Lightning organization prior to the 1993-94 season, but he only managed 3 goals and 3 assists in 22 games with the parent club in Tampa. This would ultimately be MacDougall's last chance at an NHL career, and he moved to Europe to resume playing professional hockey. He spent the next 8 seasons playing with various pro teams in Italy, Switzerland, and Germany.

McDougall would return to his native Canada in 2002 and spend six seasons with the Dundas Real McCoys of the MLH in Ontario. McDougall retired from hockey following the 2007-08 MLH season.

Retirement
Since his retirement and a 2010 divorce, McDougall has returned to Cape Breton and operates a hockey camp (Advance Hockey Development) in Toronto to help kids with off-ice training.

Career statistics

References

External links

1966 births
Living people
Adirondack Red Wings players
Atlanta Knights players
Canadian ice hockey centres
Canadian people of Scottish descent
Cape Breton Oilers players
Courmaosta HC players
Detroit Red Wings players
Edmonton Oilers players
ECH Chur players
ERC Ingolstadt players
Erie Panthers players
EV Zug players
HC Lugano players
HDD Olimpija Ljubljana players
Humboldt Broncos players
Sportspeople from Mississauga
EHC Kloten players
München Barons players
Tampa Bay Lightning players
Ice hockey people from Ontario
Undrafted National Hockey League players
Canadian expatriate ice hockey players in Slovenia
Canadian expatriate ice hockey players in Italy
Canadian expatriate ice hockey players in Germany
Canadian expatriate ice hockey players in Switzerland